Wiluqu (Aymara for a kind of bird, also spelled Viloco) is a mountain in the Bolivian Andes which reaches a height of approximately . It is located in the La Paz Department, Loayza Province, Cairoma Municipality.

References 

Mountains of La Paz Department (Bolivia)